Alex Young (born September 1, 1994) is an American athlete who competes predominantly in the hammer throw.

Professional
Alex Young tells his story in November 2022 to Coach Joe Frontier about moving multiple times to find the best training group, working 2 jobs to earn enough money and persevering to live his dream as a professional athlete.

He has represented the United States at the 2020 Summer Olympics and finished twelfth in Eugene, Oregon at the 2022 World Athletics Championships.

Young has represented his country competing in the 2013 Pan American Junior Athletics Championships in Colombia and at the 2016 NACAC U23 Championships in El Salvador. He also competed at the 2016 Olympic Trials prior to competing in the 2017 World Championships in which he finished 20th and 2022 World Championships where Young placed 12th in the final.

NCAA
A native of Nashville, Tennessee, Young competed collegiately for Southeastern Louisiana University (SLU). In 2016 he became the first SLU athlete in any sport to win a national championship at the Division I level when he won the NCAA weight throw national title. He followed that by finishing second in the 2017 NCAA hammer throw behind Cornell's Rudy Winkler.

Prep

References

External links
 
 
 
 
 
 Southeastern Louisiana Lions bio
 Alex Young Gardner–Webb Runnin' Bulldogs profile

1994 births
Living people
American male hammer throwers
Southeastern Louisiana Lions and Lady Lions
People from Nashville, Tennessee
Sportspeople from Nashville, Tennessee
World Athletics Championships athletes for the United States
Athletes (track and field) at the 2020 Summer Olympics
Olympic track and field athletes of the United States
20th-century American people
21st-century American people